Kalagan is an Austronesian dialect cluster of the Davao Region of Mindanao in the Philippines. It is also spoken in a few parts of Caraga, still in Mindanao.

Distribution
Ethnologue lists the following locations for Kalagan.
Davao del Sur Province: southwest of Davao City, along inland coasts
Compostela Valley and Davao del Norte provinces: including Samal and associated islands, and inland on eastern shores of Davao Gulf
Davao Oriental Province highlands

Kalagan dialects are:
Isamal dialect: spoken in Samal Islands
Western Kalagan: spoken in Davao Oriental Province
Lupon: spoken in Davao del Sur Province, along the gulf down to Hagonoy and Guihing near Digos
Eastern Kalagan: spoken mainly in Davao Oriental Province

Other dialects include the Kagan Kalagan which is spoken near Digos in Davao del Sur Province where there are 6,000 speakers, and the Tagakaulo which is spoken mainly in Davao del Sur Province (western shore of Davao Gulf, from Digos south to Bugis and inland), Sarangani Province (Malungon Municipality), and also in Sultan Kudarat (Columbio municipality) and South Cotabato (Tampakan) provinces.

References

Mansakan languages
Languages of Davao del Norte
Languages of Davao del Sur
Languages of Davao Occidental
Languages of Davao Oriental
Languages of Davao de Oro